Dionysius Ó Donnchadha was an Irish Roman Catholic bishop who served as the Bishop of Kilmacduagh from 1441 to 1478.

Nothing appears to be known of this bishop's term. A Diarmaid Ó Donnchadha became bishop of the same diocese in 1418.

References

Bibliography
 The Surnames of Ireland, Edward MacLysaght, 1978, ASIN: B01A0CGA4W
 A New History of Ireland: Volume IX - Maps, Genealogies, Lists, ed. T. W. Moody, F. X. Martin, F. J. Byrne, pp. 322–324, Oxford University Press; 2011, .

People from County Galway
15th-century Roman Catholic bishops in Ireland